Manfred K. L. Man (July 18, 1957-) was a jockey between 1976 and 1977. He received a full trainer's licence in 2001. Man won 35 races in the 2010/11 season for an overall total of 262.

Significant horses
 London China Town
 Tai Sing Yeh

Performance

References
The Hong Kong Jockey Club – Trainer Information
The Hong Kong Jockey Club http://www.hkjc.com/home/english/index.asp

Living people
Hong Kong horse trainers
Year of birth missing (living people)